Count Pyotr Alekseyevich Kapnist (Russian: Пётр Алексе́евич Капни́ст, born 7 September 1839, died 2 December 1904) was a Russian diplomat and ambassador. In late 1884 and early 1885 he participated as the Russian representative in the Berlin Conference. From 1895 to 1904, he was Russian ambassador to Austria.

References 

1839 births
1904 deaths
Ambassadors of the Russian Empire to Austria
Ambassadors of the Russian Empire to the Netherlands
Counts of the Russian Empire
19th-century people from the Russian Empire
20th-century Russian people
19th-century diplomats
20th-century diplomats
Moscow State University alumni
Active Privy Councillor (Russian Empire)